Ralph Berger (August 20, 1904 – December 12, 1960) was an American art director. He was nominated an Academy Award in the category Best Art Direction for the film Silver Queen. He was born and died in Los Angeles, California.

Selected filmography
 White Zombie (1932)
 Silver Queen (1942)

References

External links

1904 births
1960 deaths
American art directors
Film people from Los Angeles
Emmy Award winners